Etlingera fenzlii is a monocotyledonous plant species that was first described by Wilhelm Sulpiz Kurz, and got its current name from Škornick. and M.Sabu. Etlingera fenzlii is part of the genus Etlingera and the family Zingiberaceae.

The species' distribution area is the Nicobar Islands. No subspecies are listed in the Catalog of Life.

References 

fenzlii